Glossodoris moerchi is a species of sea slug, a dorid nudibranch, a shell-less marine gastropod mollusk in the family Chromodorididae.

Distribution 
The type locality for this species is Saint Thomas, U.S. Virgin Islands, Caribbean Sea.

Description
Glossodoris moerchi is most likely to be a species of Felimare as Mörch describes it as similar to Felimare villafranca but with a network of lines formed of rounded, triangular or hexagonal spots. The name Glossodoris moerchi was introduced by Bergh because Goniodoris picturata was preoccupied.

References

Chromodorididae
Gastropods described in 1879